is a Japanese  amateur astronomer and a discoverer of minor planets and comets.

He is credited by the Minor Planet Center with the discovery of 45 minor planets during 1988–1991, all in collaboration with astronomer Hiroshi Mori. On 5 January 1991, he has also discovered Comet Arai, .

The main-belt asteroid 21082 Araimasaru, discovered by Tsutomu Hioki and Shuji Hayakawa at Okutama in 1991, was named in his honor. Naming citation was published on 6 January 2003.

List of discovered minor planets

References

External links
 Yorii Observatory, instruments and discoveries 
 COMET ARAI (1991b), IAUC 5157, 7 January 1991
 COMET ARAI (1991b), IAUC 5170, 18 January 1991

1952 births
Discoverers of asteroids

20th-century Japanese astronomers
Living people